The Cruiser Act is a United States federal law passed by the U.S. Congress on February 13, 1929.

1929 in American law
United States federal defense and national security legislation
United States Navy in the 20th century